Rules: Pyaar Ka Superhit Formula is a 2003 Indian Hindi romance comedy film directed by Parvati Balagopalan.

Synopsis
She meets her dream boy, Vikram Verma (Milind Soman), on one such day. Needless to state, she is madly in love with him, but he has eyes for his girlfriend, the gorgeous model, Maggie (Namrata Barua). Radha's attempts to make him notice her are in vain, and in desperation, she confides in her grandma (Tanuja), for a solution. Her grandma, who wants Radha to get over her crush and get on with her life, instructs her to follow a number of simple rules, which will make Vikram notice her.

 Rule no. 1 - If you want him to notice you, don't pay attention to him, no matter how crazy you are about him.
 Rule no. 2 - Let him come after you!
 Rule no. 3 - Always be a surprise, never let him realize that he has fully understood you.
 Rule no. 4 - Never let him realize that he has the ability to hurt you emotionally.
 Rule no. 5 - Praise him for almost everything, so he is comfortable in saying 'I love you'

She follows all these rules and finally makes him fall in love with her. But she then realizes that she does not love him and that she forced him into loving her by following the rules. She feels very bad about what she has done, and breaks up with him. Vikram feels manipulated and is heartbroken. But as time passes, Radha realizes that she does actually love him and becomes very depressed. Time passes by, and one day Vikram visits her home when she isn't home, and ends up accidentally seeing all of his pictures that she has and realizes that she does love him. He is super thrilled and tries to win her back. But she is still depressed and keeps denying her love for him. One day while filming a movie, Radha accidentally ends up in a hot air balloon in life-threatening danger. Vikram jumps into the balloon and saves her and they both profess their love for each other, as the balloon floats away.

Cast 
 Tanuja as Grandmother (Dadi)
 Milind Soman as Vikram Verma
 Meera Vasudevan as Radha
 Namrata Barua as Maggie
 Rajendranath Zutshi as Uday
 Manini Mishra as Uday's wife
 Asif Basra as Aakash
 Manish Chaudhary as Aakash's partner

Music
Music composed by Vanraj Bhatia and Sandesh Shandilya.
 "Chhodo Na Mujhe" - Kunal Ganjawala
 "Chhodo Na Mujhe" v2 - Kunal Ganjawala
 "Gori Tore Nain" - Sonu Nigam
 "Gori Tore Nain" (Remix) - Sonu Nigam
 "Pyar Ke Naam Pe" - Neeraj Shridhar
 "Radha's Theme" 
 "Uljhanon Ko De Diya" - K. K., Sanjeevani

References

External links 
 

2003 films
2000s Hindi-language films
Films scored by Sandesh Shandilya
2000s English-language films